Haringey Solidarity Group or HSG is a collective of community activists based in the Borough of Haringey, London.

Aims

HSG is active in a wide range of campaigns and struggles for social justice, workers' control, public services, civil liberties and a sustainable environment. It also aims to help to build stronger local communities. HSG supports workers' disputes (e.g. postal workers, tubeworkers, Visteon workers, council bin workers) and campaigns against council cuts, health cuts, the loss of local community facilities (e.g. a local park, a community pub), and on disability, environmental, housing and claimants' issues. HSG aims to resist state control by campaigning against ID cards, against racism, oppressive policing and deaths in police custody, and in support of asylum seekers and refugees. The group holds regular open meetings and discussion evenings, and produces leaflets, posters and booklets.
HSG helps to set up and support similar groups in other London boroughs, under the name "Radical London", and wants to see ultimately a national network of such groups. The group aims to support local community struggles and hopes that other community groups will support them, this is the source of the word solidarity within their name. The group aims to practise, encourage and support self-organised struggles by ordinary people within Haringey, against bosses, local councils, or multi-national corporations.

History

HSG was formed out of the remains of the Haringey Anti Poll Tax Union, after the poll tax was defeated. "Originally set up to fight the poll tax, they decided to carry on after the tax was defeated." Initial hopes for several groups across the Borough proved to be unsustainable and after three years the groups were combined into one group. "In April 1991 it held its first meeting as Haringey Solidarity Group and by January 1992 it had formed three separate groups around the borough in Tottenham, Green Lanes, and Wood Green. Not being able to sustain three separate groups it came back together as HSG in September 1994. "  In 2006 HSG set up the popular Haringey Independent Cinema (www.haringey.org.uk/hic). HSG has also put on events to bring other groups and the community together, such as Haringey Independence Day (www.haringey.org.uk/hid).

Activities

Members of HSG are active in their residents associations, anti-fascism, and Haringey Against ID, anti billboards, anti debt campaigns, and various other antis. HSG continues to encourage  tenants and workers self organisation throughout the borough, and have supported various workers struggles in the Borough of Haringey and beyond, including the 1995 JJ Foods Strike. HSG members are also involved in organising free community festivals, the monthly Haringey Independent Cinema, and many other social events. Many of the people in HSG are involved with local resident, community and other campaigning groups around the borough. HSG regularly distributes thousands of copies of its free newsletter Totally Indypendent. The group is non-hierarchical. All major decisions are made at monthly general meetings which are open to anyone. Subgroups are formed for specific tasks (e.g. a newsletter) or to campaign on a specific issue, and these too are open to new people.

References

External links
 HSG Website
 Haringey Against ID Cards website
 Haringey Independent Cinema website
 HSG listing in Radical London: website of local anarchist and libertarian community groups

Anarchist organisations in the United Kingdom
Politics of the United Kingdom
Socialism
1991 establishments in England